Park Place Methodist Episcopal Church South (also known as Balboa Park Place) is a historic Methodist church building at 508 Olive Street in San Diego, California. It is currently a special event facility known as The Abbey and managed by Hornblower Cruises

It was built in 1910 in a Classical Revival style and was added to the National Register of Historic Places in 1983.

It was designed by architect Norman Foote Marsh.

References

External links

Methodist churches in California
Churches on the National Register of Historic Places in California
National Register of Historic Places in San Diego
Neoclassical architecture in California
Churches completed in 1910
Churches in San Diego County, California
Former churches in California
1910 establishments in California
Neoclassical church buildings in the United States